Robert Dean Smith Barbers is a Filipino government official who served as Acting Secretary of the Department of Tourism of the Philippines. He was also the general manager of the Philippine Tourism Authority (PTA) and a City Councilor of Makati.

Barbers was appointed on November 12, 2002 as general manager of the Philippine Tourism Authority (PTA) by President Gloria Macapagal Arroyo. His appointment was legally challenged by his predecessor Nixon Kua who insisted his term should end in 2006, a case Kua lost. Barber's administration also sought for the construction of the PTA Sports Complex within Intramuros which was halted by a court order in 2007.

Barber's term would expire in 2008 and he was succeeded by Ace Durano.

He is the youngest son of former Senator Robert Barbers.

References

Secretaries of Tourism of the Philippines

Arroyo administration cabinet members

Living people

Year of birth missing (living people)